Kincardine/Shepherd's Landing Airport  is located  southwest of Kincardine, Ontario, Canada. It is a small airport in Bruce Beach owned and operated by Garry Shepherd. Approx. Five airplanes are based there, and there are two hangars. The airport has one runway, with a grass surface. It is for small planes only.

See also
 Kincardine Airport
 Kincardine (Ellis Field) Airport

References

Kincardine, Ontario
Registered aerodromes in Ontario